Rider or Riders may refer to:

People
 Daniel Rider (1938–2008), American mathematician
 Fremont Rider (1885–1962), American writer and librarian
 George Rider (1890–1979), American college sports coach and administrator
 H. Rider Haggard (1856-1925), British novelist
 Isaiah Rider (born 1971), American former National Basketball Association player
 James Rider (1797–1876), New York politician
 Rider Strong (born 1979), American actor, director, producer and screenwriter
 Steve Rider (born 1950), English sports presenter and anchorman

Law
 Rider (legislation), an additional provision attached to a bill
 Rider (contract), an additional provision attached to a contract such as an insurance policy
 Rider (legal judgement), an explanation appended to a legal decision by a jury or inquest
 Rider (theater), a set of requests or demands that a performer will set as criteria for performance

Film and TV
 Steal (film), a 2002 action film also known as Riders
 The Rider (film), a 2017 American film
 Kamen Rider, a long running tokusatsu franchise
 Rider (film), a 2021 Indian Kannada-language romantic-action film

Music
 Rider (band), an offshoot band from Ultra
 Haydn's String Quartet Op. 74, No. 3, nicknamed "The Rider"; see List of string quartets by Joseph Haydn#Opus 71, 74, the "Apponyi" quartets (1793)

Songs
"Rider", a 1963 song by The Big Three
"Rider", a 1966 song by Jesse Colin Young & The Youngbloods
"Rider", a 2011 song by Okkervil River

Books
 Rider, the magazine published by the British Motorcyclists Federation
 Riders (novel), a romance novel by the British author Jilly Cooper
 Rider (imprint), a publishing imprint of Random House
 Rider (Fate/Stay Night), a character in the Japanese series Fate/Stay Night
 Rider (Fate/Zero), a character in the Japanese novel Fate/Zero
 Honeychile Rider, a character in the James Bond novel Dr. No
 Alex Rider (character), hero of a series of spy novels by Anthony Horowitz

Institutions
 Rider University, an American university in New Jersey
 Rider Broncs, said university's athletic program

Information technology
 JetBrains Rider, an integrated development environment application

See also 
 Riders (disambiguation)
 Ride (disambiguation)
 Ryder (disambiguation)
 Horserider (equestrianism)

pl:Jeździec